The 1945–46 Challenge Cup was the 45th staging of rugby league's oldest knockout competition, the Challenge Cup.

The final was contested by Wakefield Trinity and Wigan at Wembley Stadium in London. This was the first Challenge Cup to be held after the Second World War, and the final reverted to a one-leg format held at Wembley.

The final was played on Saturday 4 May 1946, where Wakefield Trinity beat Wigan 13–12 in front of a crowd of 54,730.

1945-1946

First round

Second round

Quarterfinals

Semifinals

Final

References

External links
Challenge Cup official website 
Challenge Cup 1945/46 results at Rugby League Project

Challenge Cup
Challenge Cup